Used to Love You may refer to:
 "Used to Love U", a song by John Legend from his debut studio album, Get Lifted
 "Used to Love You", a song by Gwen Stefani from her upcoming third studio album

See also 
 "Used to Love (disambiguation)", the name of several songs
 "Used to Love Her". a song by Guns N' Roses from their second studio album, G N' R Lies
 "Used to Love Him", a song by Fiona Apple from her third studio album, Extraordinary Machine
 "Used to Love You Sober", a song by Kane Brown
 "I Used to Love H.E.R.", a song by Common from his second studio album, Resurrection